Ionic Greek was a subdialect of the Attic–Ionic or Eastern dialect group of Ancient Greek.

History

The Ionic dialect appears to have originally spread from the Greek mainland across the Aegean at the time of the Dorian invasions, around the 11th century BC during the early Greek Dark Ages.

By the end of Archaic Greece and early Classical Greece in the 5th century BC, the central west coast of Asia Minor, along with the islands of Chios and Samos, formed the heartland of Ionia proper. The Ionic dialect was also spoken on islands across the central Aegean and on the large island of Euboea north of Athens. The dialect was soon spread by Ionian colonization to areas in the northern Aegean, the Black Sea, and the western Mediterranean, including Magna Graecia in Sicily and Italy.

The Ionic dialect is generally divided into two major time periods, Old Ionic (or Old Ionian) and New Ionic (or New Ionian). The transition between the two is not clearly defined, but 600 BC is a good approximation.

The  works of Homer (The Iliad, The Odyssey, and the Homeric Hymns) and of Hesiod were written in a literary dialect called Homeric Greek or Epic Greek, which largely comprises Old Ionic, with some borrowings from the neighboring Aeolic dialect to the north. The poet Archilochus wrote in late Old Ionic.

The most famous New Ionic authors are Anacreon, Theognis, Herodotus, Hippocrates, and, in Roman times, Aretaeus, Arrian, and the Lucianic or Pseudo-Lucianic On the Syrian Goddess.

Ionic acquired prestige among Greek speakers because of its association with the language used by both Homer and Herodotus and the close linguistic relationship with the Attic dialect as spoken in Athens.  This was further enhanced by the writing reform implemented in Athens in 403 BC, whereby the old Attic alphabet was replaced by the Ionic alphabet, as used by the city of Miletus.  This alphabet eventually became the standard Greek alphabet, its use becoming uniform during the Koine era. It was also the alphabet used in the Christian Gospels and the book of Acts.

Ionic subdialects 

On the basis of inscriptions three subdialects of Ionic may be discerned:

1. Western Ionic, the dialect of Euboea and Oropos;

2. Ionic of the Cycladic Islands (Central or Cycladic Ionic);

3. Eastern Ionic, the dialect of the west coast of Asia Minor.

Eastern Ionic stands apart from both other dialects because it lost at a very early time the /h/ sound (psilosis) (Herodotos should therefore properly be called Erodotos). The /w/ sound (digamma) is also completely absent from Eastern Ionic, but was sometimes retained in Western and Cycladic Ionic. Also pronouns that begin with /hop-/ in Western and Cycladic Ionic (ὅπου where, ὅπως how), begin with ok- (conventionally written hok-) in Eastern Ionic (ὅκου/ὄκου, ὅκως/ὄκως).

Western Ionic differs from Cycladic and Eastern Ionic by the sounds -tt- and -rr- where the other two have -ss- and -rs- (τέτταρες vs. τέσσαρες, four; θάρρος vs. θάρσος, bravery). Western Ionic also stands apart by using the form ξένος (xenos, foreigner, guest), where the other two use ξεῖνος (xeinos).

Cycladic Ionic may be further subdivided: Keos, Naxos, and Amorgos retained a difference between two /æ/ sounds, namely original /æ/ (written as Ε), and /æ/ evolved from /ā/ (written as Η); for example ΜΗΤΕΡ = μήτηρ < μάτηρ, mother. On the other Cycladic Islands this distinction was not made, Η and Ε were used there interchangeably.

Within Eastern Ionic, Herodotus recognized four subgroups (Histories, I.142), three of them apparently influenced by a neighbouring language:

a. The dialect of Miletus, Myus, and Priene, and their colonies, influenced by Carian;

b. The Ionic of Ephesos, Kolophon, Lebedos, Teos, Klazomenai, and Phokaia, and their colonies, influenced by Lydian;

c. The dialect of Chios and Erythrai and their colonies, influenced by Aeolic Greek;

d. The dialect of Samos and its colonies.

Differences between these four groups are not clearly visible from inscriptions, probably because inscriptions were usually ordered by a high social group that everywhere spoke the same kind of "civilized Ionic". However, local speech by the "man in the street" must have shown differences. An inkling of this may be witnessed in the language of Ephesian "beggar poet" Hipponax, who often used local slang (νικύρτας, σάβαυνις: terms of abuse; χλούνης, thief; κασωρικός, whorish) and Lydian loanwords (πάλμυς, king).

Phonology

Vowels
Proto-Greek ā > Ionic ē; in Doric, Aeolic, ā remains; in Attic, ā after e, i, r, but ē elsewhere.
 Attic νεᾱνίᾱς neāníās, Ionic νεηνίης neēníēs "young man"
 original and Doric ἁ (ᾱ) hā > Attic-Ionic ἡ hē "the" (feminine nominative singular)
 original and Doric μᾱ́τηρ mātēr > Attic-Ionic μήτηρ mḗtēr "mother"

Proto-Greek e, o > East/Central Ionic ei, ou: compensatory lengthening after loss of w in the sequences enw-, erw-, onw-, orw-. In Attic and West Ionic, e, o are not lengthened. (“East” refers to the Ionic of Anatolia, “Central” refers to the Ionic of the Cyclades, and “West” refers to the Ionic of Euboea.)
 Proto-Greek *kórwā > Attic κόρη kórē, East Ionic κούρη koúrē  "girl"
 *órwos > ὄρος óros, οὖρος oúros "mountain"
 *ksénwos > ξένος xénos, ξεῖνος xeĩnos "guest, stranger"

East Ionic generally removes initial aspiration (Proto-Greek hV- > Ionic V-).
 Proto-Greek *hāwélios > Attic hēlios, Homeric (early East Ionic) ēélios "sun"

Ionic contracts less often than Attic.
 Ionic γένεα génea, Attic γένη génē "family" (neuter nominative plural)

Consonants
Proto-Greek *kʷ before o > Attic, West/Central Ionic p, some East Ionic k.
 Proto-Greek *hókʷōs > East Ionic ὅκως hókōs, Attic ὅπως hópōs "in whatever way, in which way"

Proto-Greek *ťť > East/Central Ionic ss, West Ionic, Attic tt. This Ionic feature made it into Koine Greek.
 Proto-Greek *táťťō > Ionic τάσσω tássō, Attic τάττω táttō "I arrange"

Grammar

Word order
 Ionic had a very analytical word-order, perhaps the most analytical one within ancient Greek dialects.

Glossary
  ábdês  scourge ( Hipponax .98)
  áethlon  (Attic  athlon prize)
  aeinaûtai archontes in Miletus and Chalcis (aeí always + naûtai sailors)
 algeíē illness  (Cf.Attic  algēdṓn pain) Algophobia
 ámpōtis ebb, being sucked back, i.e. of sea (Attic anápōtis, verb anapínō) (Koine, Modern Greek ampotis)
 anou (Attic  ánō, up)
 Apatoúria Pan-ionic festival ( see also Panionium )
 appallázein (Attic  ekklesiázein gather together,decide) (Doric apellazein)
 achántion (Attic  akánthion small thorn acanthus)
 báthrakoi (Attic  bátrachoi, frogs) in Pontus babakoi
  broûkos   species of locust (Attic akrís) (Cypriots call the green locust   broúka)
 byssós (Attic  bythós depth, bottom, chaos)
 gánnos  Ephesian (Attic huaina (glanos Aristotle.HA594a31.) (Phrygian and Tsakonian ganos
 eídē   (Attic  hýle forest) (Aeolic Greek eide  also) (Greek Eidos)
 enthaûta here (entoutha also) (Attic  entaûtha) (Elean  entaûta)
 ergýlos (Attic ergátēs worker)
 hestiâchos  ionic epithet for Zeus, related to Hestia (oikourós, housekeeper,  oikônax)
 ēgós  (Attic  eudaímon happy) (Hesychius s.v. )  (τ 114)
 êélios (Attic hḗlios sun) (Cretan abelios)
 ídē forested mountain (Attic  drymôn óros) (Herodotus 4,109,2) (Mount Ida)
 iētrós, iētēr (Attic iatrós, iatēr doctor)
 íkkos (Attic  híppos, horse) (Mycenaean i-qo )
 kárē head (Common kara) (Poetic kras)
 kithṓn (Attic   chitṓn)
 koeîn (Attic  noeîn to think) noesis
 koîos  (Attic  poîos who?)
 kýthrē  (Attic  chýtra  cooking pot)
 mýttax (Attic  pṓgōn beard)
 Xouthidai  Ionians from Xuthus
 odmḗ (Attic  osmḗ scent, smell)
Demetr.Eloc.171)
 rhêchíê flood-tide, loanword to Attic as  rhachía (Homeric, Koine, Modern Greek  plêmmurís -ída)
 sabakís (Attic  sathrís decayed)  Chian
 sármoi lupins (Attic thermoi} Carystian
 skorpízô  scatter, disperse (probably from skorpios scorpion and an obsolete verb skerpô, penetrate)
 taûroi (Attic  bulls) (Ephesian word, the youths who acted as cupbearers at the local festival of Poseidon)
 phoinikḗia grámmata  Lydians and Ionians called so the letters
 chlossós (Attic  ichthús fish)
  ô oioî exclamation of discontent

See also

Ionians
Yona
Dayuan

Notes

References

Sources
 A History of Ancient Greek: From the Beginnings to Late Antiquity by A. Panayotou; Ionic and Attic
 A Grammar of the Greek Language by Benjamin Franklin Fisk;  Ionic

Further reading

Bakker, Egbert J., ed. 2010. A companion to the Ancient Greek language. Oxford: Wiley-Blackwell.
Christidis, Anastasios-Phoivos, ed. 2007. A history of Ancient Greek: From the beginnings to Late Antiquity. Cambridge, UK: Cambridge University Press.
Colvin, Stephen C. 2007. A historical Greek reader: Mycenaean to the koiné. Oxford: Oxford University Press.
Horrocks, Geoffrey C. 1987. "The Ionian epic tradition: Was there an Aeolic phase in its development?" Minos 20–22: 269–94.
––––. Greek: A history of the language and its speakers. 2nd ed. Oxford: Wiley-Blackwell.
Palmer, Leonard R. 1980. The Greek language. London: Faber & Faber.
West, Martin L. 1974. Studies in Greek elegy and iambus. Berlin: de Gruyter.

 
Ionia
Languages of ancient Macedonia
Languages of ancient Thrace
Greek
Greek
Languages attested from the 11th century BC
11th-century BC establishments
Languages extinct in the 3rd century BC
3rd-century BC disestablishments